Brighton is an unincorporated community located in the town of Brighton, Kenosha County, Wisconsin, United States.

References

Unincorporated communities in Kenosha County, Wisconsin
Unincorporated communities in Wisconsin